A membrane-bound protein, is a protein that is bound (attached) to a biological membrane, may refer to: 

 Integral membrane protein (permanently attached or built in)
 Peripheral membrane protein (temporarily attached)